Rospebach is a river of North Rhine-Westphalia, Germany. It flows into the Agger near Gummersbach. The source of the Rospebach lies on the southern slopes of the Arzhöhe, about 800 m southeast of the Gummersbach district Herreshagen at an altitude of 317 m above sea level. From here it flows primarily south through Wasserfuhr, Gummersbach and Mühle before joining the Agger in Vollmerhausen at 168 m above sea level. On its way from the source to the mouth the Rospebach overcomes 149 meters of altitude, which corresponds to an average bed slope of 18.2 ‰.

Environment According to the investigation of the Ministry of the Environment and Conservation, Agriculture and Consumer Protection of North Rhine -Westphalia the Rospebach has predominantly charged a water quality of the creek II This applies on long drives as standard. The water structure quality of the river is used for more than 70% of the river the structural quality classes assigned to 6 and 7. The river is thus changed considerably, to 38% even changed completely. After a distance of 1 km from the creek reaches the district Wasserfuhr. From here, the river of traffic routes is accompanied: in the village itself from the county road 42, behind Wasserfuhr comes from the north or the highway 256 and on the eastern side of the valley the path to Volmetal. Federal road and railway follow the river to its mouth in the Agger.

See also
List of rivers of North Rhine-Westphalia

Rivers of North Rhine-Westphalia
Rivers of Germany